Rakića Kuće is a village in the municipality of Tuzi, Montenegro. It is located halfway between Tuzi and Podgorica.

Demographics
According to the 2011 census, its population was 279.

References

Populated places in Tuzi Municipality
Albanian communities in Montenegro